Padhana Gujar is a town in the Islamabad Capital Territory of Pakistan. It is located at 33° 17' 40N 73° 21' 35E with an altitude of 480 metres (1578 feet).

References 

Union councils of Islamabad Capital Territory